Joakim Kjellbom (born April 22, 1979) is an American-born Swedish former professional basketball player. Kjellbom plays as center. He is one of the most successful basketball players in the history of Swedish basketball, as he has won three Swedish League MVP Awards.

Professional career
Kjellbom won his first MVP title in 2007–08 season while playing for Sundsvall Dragons. He won the title a second time in 2009–10 season while playing for the Norrköping Dolphins. His third and last MVP award was in the 2015–16 season, when he was 37 years old and playing for also for the Norrköping Dolphins. This makes him the second most decorated MVP player in Swedish basketball. Fred Drains won the title four times.

References

1979 births
Living people
Centers (basketball)
Junior college men's basketball players in the United States
Northern Arizona Lumberjacks men's basketball players
Norrköping Dolphins players
Sundsvall Dragons players
Swedish men's basketball players
Swedish expatriate basketball people in the United States